Mkalama District is one of the six districts of the Singida Region of Tanzania. It is one of the 20 new districts that were formed in Tanzania since 2010; it was split off from Iramba District. Mkalama District is bordered to the north by Simiyu Region and Arusha Region, to the east by Manyara Region, to the south by Singida Rural District and to the west by Iramba District.

According to the 2012 Tanzania National Census, the population of Mkalama District was 188,733.

Transport
Paved trunk road T3 from Morogoro to the Rwandan border passes through a small portion of the district.

Administrative subdivisions
As of 2012, Mkalama District was administratively divided into 14 wards.

Wards

 Gumanga
 Ibaga
 Iguguno
 Ilunda
 Kikhonda
 Kinyangiri
 Matongo
 Miganga
 Mpambala
 Msingi (English meaning: Primary or Foundation)
 Mwanga
 Mwangeza
 Nduguti
 Nkinto

References

Districts of Singida Region